Adam Grant Parker (born Christchurch, 21 April 1973), was a New Zealand rugby union player who played as lock or as flanker. He played internationally for Japan.

Career
Parker started his career playing in 1995, playing for South Canterbury in the NPC, the following year he moved to Nelson Bays, earning 5 caps in the club. In 1999, Parker moved to Japan, where he joined Toshiba Fuchu, with which he won the All-Japan Rugby Football Championship in 2004, the same year he left the club. He was also a New Zealand Maori team member in 1998, where he was also a trialist. He was first capped for Japan on 19 May 2000, against Russia, at Chichibunomiya Rugby Stadium. Parker was also part of the 2003 Rugby World Cup squad, playing 4 matches at the tournament. His final cap for Japan was against Italy, on 4 July 2004.

References

External links
Adam Grant Parker at New Zealand Rugby History
Adam Parker international stats

1973 births
Rugby union players from Christchurch
Living people
New Zealand Māori rugby union players
New Zealand expatriate sportspeople in Japan
New Zealand rugby union players
Toshiba Brave Lupus Tokyo players
Japanese rugby union players
Japan international rugby union players
Rugby union locks